Francisco Jara Garribay (born 3 February 1941) is a Mexican former footballer who played as a forward for Mexico at the 1966 FIFA World Cup. He also played for Guadalajara.

References

External links
FIFA profile

1941 births
Mexican footballers
Mexico international footballers
Association football forwards
Tigres UANL footballers
Liga MX players
1966 FIFA World Cup players
Living people